Qarajeh Malek (also Romanized as Qarājeh Malek and Qarājeh Molk; also known as Gharajeh Malek, Karadzha, Karajamulik, and Qarājeh Malīk) is a village in Ozomdel-e Jonubi Rural District, in the Central District of Varzaqan County, East Azerbaijan Province, Iran. At the 2006 census, its population was 75, in 16 families.

References 

Towns and villages in Varzaqan County